Bilyeu is a surname possibly with French origin. Notable people with the surname include:

Diane Bilyeu (born 1935), American politician
Justin Bilyeu (born 1994), American soccer player

References